Kirill Andreyevich Panyukov (born 22 May 1997) is a Kazakhstani professional ice hockey winger who currently plays for Ak Bars Kazan of the Kontinental Hockey League (KHL).

Playing career
Panyukov previously played North American junior hockey for the Sioux Falls Stampede of the United States Hockey League (USHL). He made his professional debut with homeland club, Barys Nur-Sultan of the KHL. 

Following his fourth season in the KHL with Barys Nur-Sultan in 2020–21, Panyukov was traded to Russian club, Ak Bars Kazan, in exchange for monetary compensation on 15 May 2021.

International play
Internationally he has played for the Kazakhstan national junior team at two World Junior Championships, and played for the Kazakhstan national team at the 2017 World Championship Division I tournament.

Career statistics

International

References

External links 

1997 births
Ak Bars Kazan players
Barys Nur-Sultan players
Kazakhstani ice hockey left wingers
Kazakhstani people of Russian descent
Living people
Sportspeople from Astana
Sioux Falls Stampede players
Snezhnye Barsy players
Kazakhstani expatriate sportspeople in the United States
Kazakhstani expatriate sportspeople in Russia
Expatriate ice hockey players in the United States
Expatriate ice hockey players in Russia
Kazakhstani expatriate ice hockey people